Lindsay Davenport and Mary Joe Fernández were scheduled to play Tracy Austin and Gigi Fernández in the final. However, the match was canceled on 12 September due to rain and was not rescheduled.

Draw

Bracket

External links 
 Main draw

Women's Champions Invatiational